William Inglis may refer to:

 William Inglis (auctioneer) (1832–1896), Australian auctioneer
 William Inglis and Sons, Australian bloodstock auction company
 William Inglis (British Army officer) (1764–1835), British officer and Governor of Cork
 William Inglis (knight), Scottish knight
 William Beresford Inglis (died 1967), Scottish architect
 William Inglis (ferry), a 1935 Toronto Island ferry
 William Inglis (surgeon) (1713–1792), Scottish surgeon

See also
 Bill Inglis (disambiguation)

Inglis, William